This is a list of notable songwriter teams.

Rock, soul and pop
 there are some missing, say: Page-Plant; Anderson-Howe

Jazz

Musicals

Opera

Duos
 Benny Andersson and Björn Ulvaeus
 Jimmy Jam and Terry Lewis
 Harold Arlen and Johnny Mercer
 Nick Ashford and Valerie Simpson
 Howard Ashman and Alan Menken
 Burt Bacharach and Hal David
 Alan and Marilyn Bergman
 Bono and The Edge
 Mike Chapman and Nicky Chinn
 Roger Cook and Roger Greenaway
 Bernard Edwards and Nile Rodgers
 Donald Fagen and Walter Becker
 Michael Flanders and Donald Swann
 John Flansburgh and John Linnell (They Might Be Giants)
 Andrew Farriss and Michael Hutchence
 Charles Fox and Norman Gimbel
 Arthur Freed and Nacio Herb Brown
 Jerry Garcia and Robert Hunter
 Ira Gershwin and George Gershwin
 W.S. Gilbert and Arthur Sullivan
 Gerry Goffin and Carole King
 Mack Gordon and Harry Revel
 Ellie Greenwich and Jeff Barry
 Isaac Hayes and David Porter
 Don Henley and Glenn Frey
 Mick Jagger and Keith Richards
 Antônio Carlos Jobim and Vinicius de Moraes
 Elton John and Bernie Taupin
 John Kander and Fred Ebb
 Jerome Kern and Oscar Hammerstein II
 Jerry Leiber and Mike Stoller
 John Lennon and Paul McCartney
 Alan Jay Lerner and Frederick Loewe
 Jay Livingston and Ray Evans
 Andrew Lloyd Webber and Tim Rice
 Barry Mann and Cynthia Weil
 Jimmy McHugh and Harold Adamson
 Steve Marriott and Ronnie Lane
 Jimmy McHugh and Dorothy Fields
 Steven Morrissey and Johnny Marr
 Jimmy Page and Robert Plant
 Benj Pasek and Justin Paul
 Doc Pomus and Mort Shuman
 Leo Robin and Ralph Rainger
 Richard Rodgers and Oscar Hammerstein II
 Richard Rodgers and Lorenz Hart
 Robert B. Sherman and Richard M. Sherman
 Joe Strummer and Mick Jones
 Neil Tennant and Chris Lowe
 Steven Tyler and Joe Perry
 Jimmy Van Heusen and Sammy Cahn
 Harry Warren and Al Dubin
 Gene Ween and Dean Ween
 Norman Whitfield and Barrett Strong
 Brian Wilson and Mike Love
 Chris Difford and Glenn Tilbrook
 Scott Stapp and Mark Tremonti
 James Hetfield and Lars Ulrich
 Jon Bon Jovi and Richie Sambora
 Brett Gurewitz and Greg Graffin
 Robbie Williams and Guy Chambers
 Harry Vanda and George Young
 Jon Anderson and Chris Squire

Trios
 Barry, Robin & Maurice Gibb
 Brian Holland, Lamont Dozier and Eddie Holland, Jr.
 Mike Stock, Matt Aitken, Peter Waterman

References

 
Musical collaborations
Music-related lists